Agliardi  is a surname of Italian origin. People with this surname include:

 Antonio Agliardi (1832-1915), Italian cardinal, archbishop, and papal diplomat
 Federico Agliardi (born 1983), Italian footballer

Italian-language surnames